Chris "Harold" Raymond is a former American football player and coach. He served as the head football coach at Colby College in Waterville, Maine from 1983 to 1985, compiling a record of 5–19. He is the son of long-time Delaware Blue Hens football coach Harold "Tubby" Raymond.

References

Year of birth missing (living people)
Living people
Colby Mules football coaches
Delaware Fightin' Blue Hens football coaches
Maine Black Bears football coaches
Trinity Bantams football coaches
Tufts Jumbos coaches
Virginia Cavaliers football players